The Cotterell Baronetcy, of Garnons in the County of Hereford, is a title in the Baronetage of the United Kingdom. It was created on 2 November 1805 for John Cotterell, Member of Parliament for Herefordshire for many years. The third Baronet also represented this constituency in the House of Commons. The fourth Baronet was Lord-Lieutenant of Herefordshire.

Cotterell baronets, of Garnons (1805)
Sir John Geers Cotterell, 1st Baronet (1757–1845)
Sir John Henry Cotterell, 2nd Baronet (1830–1847)
Sir Geers Henry Cotterell, 3rd Baronet (1834–1900)
Sir John Richard Geers Cotterell, 4th Baronet (1866–1937)
Sir Richard Charles Geers Cotterell, CBE, 5th Baronet (1907–1978)
Sir John Henry Geers Cotterell, 6th Baronet (1935–2017)
Sir Henry Richard Geers Cotterell, 7th Baronet (born 1961)

The heir apparent is the present holder's son Richard John Geers Cotterell (born 1990).

Notes

References
Kidd, Charles, Williamson, David (editors). Debrett's Peerage and Baronetage (1990 edition). New York: St Martin's Press, 1990, 

Cotterell